In mathematics, Dixon's identity (or Dixon's theorem or Dixon's formula) is any of several different but closely related identities proved by A. C. Dixon, some involving finite sums of products of three binomial coefficients, and some evaluating a hypergeometric sum.  These identities famously follow from the MacMahon Master theorem, and can now be routinely proved by computer algorithms .

Statements

A generalization, also sometimes called Dixon's identity, is

where a, b, and c are non-negative integers . 
The sum on the left can be written as the terminating well-poised hypergeometric series

and the identity follows as a limiting case (as a tends to an integer) of 
Dixon's theorem evaluating  a well-poised 3F2 generalized hypergeometric series at 1, from :

This holds for Re(1 + a − b − c) > 0. As c tends to −∞ it reduces to Kummer's formula for the hypergeometric function 2F1 at −1. Dixon's theorem can be deduced from the evaluation of the Selberg integral.

q-analogues
A q-analogue of Dixon's formula for the basic hypergeometric series in terms of the q-Pochhammer symbol is given by

where |qa1/2/bc| < 1.

References

 

Enumerative combinatorics
Factorial and binomial topics
Hypergeometric functions
Mathematical identities